Live in Antibes is a live album by Archie Shepp and the Full Moon Ensemble recorded at the Juan les Pins Jazz Festival in Antibes, France, on July 18, 1970. It was originally released on the BYG Actuel label in two volumes and re-released as a double CD in 2002. The album features a performance by Shepp, Clifford Thornton, Alan Shorter, Joseph Dejean, Beb Guerin and Claude Delcloo.

Track listing 
All compositions by Archie Shepp
 "The Early Bird" - 48:48
 "Huru" - 48:51
Recorded live at Antibes - Juan les Pins Jazz Festival, July 18, 1970

Personnel 
 Archie Shepp – tenor saxophone, piano, recitation
 Clifford Thornton - trumpet, piano, shehnai
 Alan Shorter - flugelhorn
 Joseph Dejean - guitar
 Beb Guerin - double bass
 Claude Delcloo - drums

References 

1971 live albums
Archie Shepp live albums
BYG Actuel live albums
Albums recorded at Jazz à Juan